Universidad Experimental Politécnica Antonio José de Sucre Vicerectorado Luis Caballero Mejías is a university in Caracas.

External links
 "UNEXPO Luis Caballero Mejías" Pagina oficial del Vicerrectorado.

Universities and colleges in Caracas